Russian Indians include Indian expatriates in Russia, as well as Russian citizens of Indian origin or descent.

Religion
A majority of Indians living in Russia are Hindus, with other populations including Christians of Indian origin, Muslims and Sikhs. 
Hinduism is practised in Russia, though most ignore it, primarily by followers of the Vaishnava Hindu organization International Society for Krishna Consciousness, Brahma Kumaris and by itinerant swamis from India. There is an active Tantra Sangha operating in Russia.

Notable people
 Swati Reddy – Indian film actress and television presenter (born in Vladivostok)
 Abani Mukherji - Indian revolutionary and co-founder of the Communist Party of India (CPI)
 Elena Tuteja – Miss India Earth 2017 Second Runner UP  and Indian Model 
 Alesia Raut – Indian model & actress
 Anjali Raut – Younger sister of Alesia Raut Indian Fashion Model 
 Dina Umarova – Russian Supermodel & Indian actor Vindu Dara Singh's wife
 Abhay Kumar Singh – Indian-born member of legislator in United Russia.

See also
 Hinduism in Russia
 India–Russia relations

References

Asian diaspora in Russia
Ethnic groups in Russia
Russia